A tajine or tagine is a North African dish, named after the earthenware pot in which it is cooked.

Etymology 
The Arabic  is derived from the Berber  'shallow earthen pot', from Ancient Greek  'frying-pan, saucepan'.

Origin 
According to Rebecca Jones, in the 1990s, the late Dr Vivien Swan identified pottery from various sites on Scotland's Antonine Wall, built by the Numidian governor of Roman Britain, Quintus Lollius Urbicus, of a north African style, one being a casserole dish that may have been a precursor to the modern tajine. Fragments of tajines have also been identified among Numidian ceramics in modern-day Tunisia.

According to some sources, the history of tagine dates back to the time of Harun al-Rashid, the fifth Abbasid Caliph. The concept of cooking in a tajine appears in the famous One Thousand and One Nights, an Arabic-language story collection from the 9th century.

Today, the cooking pot and its traditional broth are primarily prepared in the Middle East and North Africa. There are different ways to prepare the tajine. In the original qidra style,  (clarified butter) is used to lubricate the surface and a puree of chopped onion is added for flavour and aroma. For -style cooking, the ingredients are placed in olive oil to enrich the flavours.

According to the historian of Jewish food Gil Marks, the unique two-piece cooking vessel made from red clay called tajine originates from Morocco (Anti-Atlas Mountains). 

There are many descriptions of how to prepare a tajine from Arab scholars. A famous description is the one from ibn al-Adim (1192–1262):

Pottery

The traditional tajine pottery, sometimes painted or glazed, consists of two parts: a circular base unit that is flat with low sides and a large cone- or dome-shaped cover that sits on the base during cooking. The cover is designed to return all condensation to the bottom. That process can be improved by adding cold water into the specially designed well at the top of the lid.

Tajine is traditionally cooked over hot charcoal leaving an adequate space between the coals and the tajine pot to avoid having the temperature rise too quickly. Large bricks of charcoal are used, specifically for their ability to stay hot for hours.  Other methods are to use a tajine in a slow oven or on a gas or electric stove top, on the lowest heat necessary to keep the stew simmering gently. A diffuser, a circular utensil placed between the tajine and the flame, is used to evenly distribute the stove's heat. European manufacturers have created tajines with heavy cast-iron bottoms that can be heated on a cooking stove to a high temperature, which permits the browning of meat and vegetables before cooking.

Tajine cooking may be replicated by using a slow cooker or similar item, but the result will be slightly different. Many ceramic tajines are decorative items as well as functional cooking vessels. Some tajines, however, are intended only to be used as decorative serving dishes.

Algerian and Moroccan tajine 

Algerian and Moroccan tajine dishes are slow-cooked savory stews, typically made with sliced meat, poultry or fish together with vegetables or fruit. Spices, nuts, and dried fruits are also used. Common spices include ginger, cumin, turmeric, cinnamon, and saffron. Paprika and chili are used in vegetable tajines. The sweet and sour combination is common in tajine dishes like lamb with prunes and spices. Tajines are generally served with bread. Because the domed or cone-shaped lid of the tajine pot traps steam and returns the condensed liquid to the pot, a minimal amount of water is needed to cook meats and vegetables. This method of cooking is important in areas where water supplies are limited or where public water is not yet available.

Tunisian tajine

What Tunisians refer to as a "tajine" is very different from other forms of the dish. Tunisian tajine is more like an Italian frittata or an eggah. First, a simple ragout is prepared, of meat cut into very small pieces, cooked with onions and spices, such as a blend of dried rosebuds and ground cinnamon known as baharat or a robust combination of ground coriander and caraway seeds; this is called tabil. Then something starchy is added to thicken the juices. Common thickeners include cannellini beans, chickpeas, breadcrumbs or cubed potatoes. When the meat is tender, it is combined with the ingredients which have been chosen to be the dominant flavouring. Examples include fresh parsley, dried mint, saffron, sun-dried tomatoes, cooked vegetables and stewed calves' brains. Next, the stew is enriched with cheese and eggs. Finally, this egg and stew are baked in a deep pie dish, either on the stove or in the oven until top and bottom are crisply cooked and the eggs are just set. When the tajine is ready, it is turned out onto a plate and sliced into squares, accompanied by wedges of lemon. Tunisian tajines can also be made with seafood or as a completely vegetarian dish.

In rural parts of Tunisia, home cooks place a shallow earthenware dish over olive-wood coals, fill it, cover it with a flat earthenware pan, and then pile hot coals on top. The resulting tajine is crusty on top and bottom, moist within and is infused with a subtle smoky fragrance.

Maghrebi Jewish tagine
Maghrebi Jews also eat and prepare tagine, owing to their historic presence in North Africa. Tagine is a very important dish in Sephardi cuisine, and is commonly eaten and prepared by Moroccan Jews, Algerian Jews, Tunisian Jews, Libyan Jews, Djerban Jews, and also by French Jews, Jewish Americans, and Israelis, due to the large population of Sephardim in those countries.

Tagine is a mainstay of Sephardic cuisine commonly prepared for Shabbat dinners in the Sephardi community, and served with couscous. Sephardim from different regions prepare different styles of Tagine, for instance Moroccan Jews often prepare tagine with dried fruits, while Tunisian Jews often prepare a vegetable tagine containing potatoes, carrots, and zucchini cut into a large dice. Tagine is also commonly prepared for Jewish holidays such as Rosh Hashanah and the Yom Kippur break fast.

Gallery

See also

 List of Middle Eastern dishes
 List of African dishes
 List of egg dishes
 Berber cuisine
 List of stews
 Rfissa
 List of cooking vessels

References

Further reading

External links

Algerian cuisine
Arab cuisine
Cookware and bakeware
Cypriot cuisine
Mizrahi Jewish cuisine
Maghrebi cuisine
Mediterranean cuisine
Moroccan cuisine
North African cuisine
Sephardi Jewish cuisine
Staple foods
Stews
Tunisian cuisine
Middle Eastern cuisine
Berber cuisine